Yiannis "Dan" Georgiadis (5 May 1922 – 18 January 1998) was a Greek football player and manager.

He was born in Ithaca, but grew up in Athens.

He played for Panathinaikos.

He managed Sport Boys, Ferro Carril Oeste, Greece, Panachaiki, Olympiacos, La Chaux-de-Fonds, Sevilla, Alianza Lima, Panionios, Trikala, and Montreux Sports.

References

1922 births
1998 deaths
Panathinaikos F.C. players
Greek football managers
Sport Boys managers
Club Atlético Banfield managers
Ferro Carril Oeste managers
Panionios F.C. managers
Panachaiki F.C. managers
Olympiacos F.C. managers
FC La Chaux-de-Fonds managers
Club Alianza Lima managers
Bolivia national football team managers
Peru national football team managers
Greece national football team managers
Sevilla FC managers
Athlitiki Enosi Larissa F.C. managers
Club Bolívar managers
Venezuela national football team managers
Expatriate football managers in Argentina
Expatriate football managers in Bolivia
Expatriate football managers in Chile
Expatriate football managers in Peru
Expatriate football managers in Haiti
Expatriate football managers in Spain
Expatriate football managers in Switzerland
Expatriate football managers in Paraguay
Expatriate football managers in Venezuela
People from Ithaca
Trikala F.C. managers
Haiti national football team managers
Club Libertad managers
Santiago Wanderers managers
Greek expatriate sportspeople in Spain
Greek expatriate sportspeople in Switzerland
Association football goalkeepers
Footballers from Athens
Greek footballers
Greek expatriate football managers
Greek expatriate sportspeople in Haiti
Greek expatriate sportspeople in Peru
Greek expatriate sportspeople in Venezuela
Greek expatriate sportspeople in Bolivia
Greek expatriate sportspeople in Chile
Greek expatriate sportspeople in Paraguay
Greek expatriate sportspeople in Romania
Expatriate footballers in Romania